Ligiidae is a family of woodlice, the only family in the infraorder Diplocheta. Its members are common on rocky shores, in similar habitats to those inhabited by species of the bristletail Petrobius and the crab Cyclograpsus. The family contains these genera:
Caucasoligidium Borutzky, 1950
Ligia Fabricius, 1798
Ligidioides Wahrberg, 1922
Ligidium Brandt, 1833
Tauroligidium Borutzky, 1950
Typhloligidium Verhoeff, 1918

References

Woodlice
Crustacean families